Ectoedemia viridissimella is a moth of the family Nepticulidae. It is found in Poland, the Czech Republic, Austria and Italy.

The wingspan is 5.2-5.4 mm. Adults are on wing in May. There is probably one generation per year.

The larvae feed on Peucedanum cervaria. They mine the leaves of their host plant. The mine consists of a long, slender corridor, mostly in the centre of the leaf. The frass is concentrated in a narrow, green, frequently broken central line. The corridor widens into a large blotch with dispersed frass. Pupation takes place outside of the mine.

External links
Fauna Europaea
bladmineerders.nl
Identity Of Two Nepticulidae Described By A. Caradja (Lepidoptera)

Nepticulidae
Moths of Europe
Moths described in 1920